Gilit may refer to:
 Gilgit, locally known as Gilit, a city in northern Pakistan
 Gilit Arabic, a variety of the Mesopotamian Arabic language